Green-Wood Cemetery is a  cemetery in the western portion of Brooklyn, New York City. The cemetery is located between South Slope/Greenwood Heights, Park Slope, Windsor Terrace, Borough Park, Kensington, and Sunset Park, and lies several blocks southwest of Prospect Park. Its boundaries include, among other streets, 20th Street to the northeast, Fifth Avenue to the northwest, 36th and 37th Streets to the southwest, Fort Hamilton Parkway to the south, and McDonald Avenue to the east.

Green-Wood Cemetery was founded in 1838 as a rural cemetery, in a time of rapid urbanization when churchyards in New York City were becoming overcrowded. Described as "Brooklyn's first public park by default long before Prospect Park was created", Green-Wood Cemetery was so popular that it inspired a competition to design Central Park in Manhattan, as well as Prospect Park nearby.

The cemetery was listed on the National Register of Historic Places in 1997 and was made a National Historic Landmark in 2006. In addition, the 25th Street gates, the Weir Greenhouse, and the Fort Hamilton Parkway Gate & Green-Wood Cemetery Chapel were separately designated as city landmarks by the New York City Landmarks Preservation Commission at various times.

Design 

Green-Wood's site is characterized by varied topography created by glacial moraines, particularly the Harbor Hill Moraine. It was the site of an important action during the Battle of Long Island on August 27, 1776. A Revolutionary War monument by Frederick Ruckstull, Altar to Liberty: Minerva, was erected there in 1920. From this height, the bronze Minerva statue gazes towards the Statue of Liberty across New York Harbor.

Green-Wood was less inspired by Père Lachaise Cemetery in Paris, which at the time retained the primarily axial formality of Alexandre Théodore Brongniart's original design, than by Mount Auburn Cemetery in Cambridge, Massachusetts, where a cemetery in a naturalistic park-like landscape in the English manner was first established. It has been called "Brooklyn's first public park by default long before Prospect Park was created." The architecture critic Paul Goldberger, quoting The New York Times from 1866, observed that "it is the ambition of the New Yorker to live upon the Fifth Avenue, to take his airings in the [Central] Park, and to sleep with his fathers in Green-wood".

The landscape includes rolling hills and dales, several ponds, and an on-site chapel. In 2017, it received 280,000 visitors. Though at one point there were numerous gravediggers at Green-Wood,  there were just a few gravediggers due to a decrease in the number of burials, as well as the limited amount of space for new burials. Because of this shortage of space, several family members may be buried atop each other in some plots.

Several wooden shelters were also built, including one in a Gothic Revival style, one resembling an Italian villa, and another resembling a Swiss chalet. These shelters, designed by Richard Upjohn, had largely deteriorated by the late 20th century except for a ladies' shelter. In 2008, Green-Wood started to acquire a collection of art pertaining to those buried in the cemetery.

Landscaping and circulation 
Green-Wood Cemetery contains numerous landscape features, which in turn are named after terms that evoke a naturalistic scene. These names include Camellia Path, Halcyon Lake, Oaken Bluff, Sylvan Cliff, and Vista Hill. David Bates Douglass, Green-Wood's landscape architect, mostly kept the cemetery's natural landscaping intact. Much of Douglass's plan is still in place with its original plantings and curving-road systems. The original street names and original cast-iron perimeter fence have been retained, but many of the roads have been paved.

The cemetery has been expanded several times. Most of these regions have been landscaped to resemble the original plot, except the area near Fort Hamilton Avenue to the north, which is flatter because it was acquired last.

Monuments 
There are several notable monuments and mausoleums in the cemetery, designed in several styles including the Classical, Egyptian, Gothic, and Romanesque. Some of monuments and mausoleums were designed by popular architects of the time, including Minard Lafever, Richard Upjohn, and Warren and Wetmore. In addition, many tombs contain ornate sculptural decoration. The National Register of Historic Places designation subdivides these monuments into four primary categories: those honoring events or professions; those with architectural significance; those whose graves contain people of historical significance; and "monuments of sculptural interest".

Among the first monuments was a statue of DeWitt Clinton, built in 1853. There is also a memorial erected by James Brown, president of both Brown Brothers bank and the Collins Line, to the six members of his family lost in the  disaster of 1854. This incorporates a sculpture of the ship, half-submerged by the waves, as well as a Civil War Memorial. In 1868–1876, after the war ended, the  Civil War Soldiers' Monument was erected at the highest point in Green-Wood.

Other monuments of note include the Pilots' Monument and the Sea Captain's Monument, each dedicated to a notable person in these respective professions. J. Marion Sims, a monument of gynecologist J. Marion Sims by Ferdinand Freiherr von Miller, is also planned to be installed in Green-Wood; the statue was formerly in Bryant Park and Central Park but was removed from the latter in 2017. Some elaborate monuments honor notable figures, such as William Niblo's Grand Gothic mausoleum, the Steinway & Sons family's Classical mausoleum, Abiel Abbot Low's tomb, and the Lispenard family's Norman-style mausoleum. Numerous other monuments to notable figures exist but are extremely simple in design, such as the tombs of Samuel Morse, William M. Tweed, Lola Montez, Henry Ward Beecher, and Currier and Ives. On the other hand, several monuments commemorate less well-known figures, including a Gothic memorial for 17-year-old Charlotte Canda, and a High Victorian pier designed by William or Edward Potter for their relatives.

Gates 

The gates were designed by Richard Upjohn in Gothic Revival style. There are four gates in total. Two are city landmarks: the main gate at 25th Street to the northwest, which is closest to South Slope/Greenwood Heights, and Fort Hamilton Parkway to the south, which is in Kensington. Two additional gates exist. One of these, at 20th Street and Ninth Avenue, provides access from the northeast and is in Windsor Terrace. These gates were developed from the 1840s to the 1860s. A fifth gate at Ninth Avenue and 37th Street no longer exists.

25th Street gate 
The main entrance to the cemetery, a double-gate located at 25th Street and Fifth Avenue near its northwestern corner, was built in 1861–65, though the entrance itself opened in 1862. It is composed of Belleville, New Jersey brownstone. The sculptured groups on Nova Scotia limestone panels depicting biblical scenes of death and resurrection from the New Testament including Lazarus, The Widow's Son, and Jesus' Resurrection over the gateways are the work of sculptor John M. Moffitt. In between the two gateways is a clock tower in the Flamboyant style. A cemetery office is to one side of the gate, while the chapel and reception room are on the opposite side. A descendant colony of monk parakeets that are believed to have escaped their containers while in transit now nests in the spires of the gate, as well as other areas in Brooklyn.

The New York Community Trust placed a Designated Landmarks of New York plaque on the gate in 1958, and the gate was designated an official New York City landmark in 1966.

Fort Hamilton gate 

The Fort Hamilton gate is located at Fort Hamilton Parkway and Macieli Place. Similar to the 25th Street gate, it is made of a double gateway made of brownstone. It is also flanked by two structures, a visitor's lounge and the gatekeeper's residence. The gate was built in 1876 and completed the next year; it was designated as an official New York City landmark in 2016.

To the east of the entrance is the visitor's lounge, a brownstone building. It is a -story structure with an entrance located inside a center bay on the west side of the building. The visitor's lounge contains two side bays, each with a porch, as well as restrooms for men and women. The hip roof is made of gray slate with metal ornamentation along the ridge at the top. The roof slopes down toward the perimeter walls of the building, though each of the four sides of the roof is punctuated by dormers with small windows. The corner porches feature stone banisters, and contain four yellow sandstone bas-reliefs sculpted by Moffitt.

The west side of the entrance, also a brownstone structure, contains the gatekeeper's residence, a -story structure that is similar in design to the visitor's lounge. Only the center section is  stories, while the two pavilions to the west and east are  stories. The residence's main entrance is through the eastern pavilion, while there is another pavilion on the western facade. Both pavilions have hip roofs of gray slate, and the second floor contains dormers with windows that project from the hip roof. The central "tower" section contains entrances to both the north and south, as well as windows on the second, third, and attic floors that face north and south. The roof of the central tower contains a stone chimney.

Chapel 

The Green-Wood Cemetery chapel is located near the 25th Street gate. Built in 1911–1913 by Warren and Wetmore, the chapel is located on the site of one of Green-Wood's original ponds. Though it is generally designed in the late Gothic style, its massing is in the Beaux-Arts style. It is made of limestone, and consists of multiple towers, including a central octagonal tower and four octagonal turrets, one at each corner. The three-story chapel contains a ground level, clerestory level, and the second story in the central tower. It was patterned after the Tom Tower at Christ Church, Oxford.

Plans for the Green-Wood chapel date to shortly after the chapel's establishment, when a "Chapel Hill" was set aside within the cemetery. Though Richard Upjohn submitted plans for such a chapel in 1855, Green-Wood initially voted against such a chapel.  A new location was selected near Arbor Water in the first decade of the 20th century, and plans were solicited from three firms in 1909. After Warren and Wetmore were selected, work started in 1911, and the chapel was officially opened in June 1913. The chapel was made a city landmark in 2016.

History

Founding and construction 

Following the founding of Mount Auburn Cemetery in Massachusetts in 1831, leaders of the cities of New York and Brooklyn began discussing locations to build a cemetery of their own. At the time, over 10,000 people were being buried per year in the two cities. The cemetery was the idea of Henry Evelyn Pierrepont, a Brooklyn social leader. As early as 1832, Pierrepont was considering constructing such a cemetery on a hilly area to the east of Gowanus Bay. David Bates Douglass, Green-Wood's landscape architect, started working on the layout in 1838. He opposed an early suggestion to call the cemetery a necropolis, as he thought the landscaped site should also attract the living.

On April 11, 1839, a modification to that act was enacted, changing the corporation to a nonprofit organization. Construction started in May 1839 and the first interment was performed on September 5, 1840. At that point, the cemetery commissioners decided to enclose the site with a long picket fence (later replaced with a metal fence in 1860). Douglass mostly kept the cemetery's natural landscaping intact, working on the project until he resigned in 1841. Douglass modeled his two subsequently designed garden cemeteries upon Green-Wood: Albany Rural Cemetery (1845–1846), located in Menands, New York, and Mount Hermon Cemetery (1848), in Quebec City. The earliest map dating from 1846 indicates that there were originally three ponds in Green-Wood: Sylvan Water, Green-Isle Water, and Arbor Water, all on the western side of the modern cemetery.

There were initially very few burials per year; by 1843, there had been 352 burials total, though the number of burials doubled just in the next year. Throughout the 1840s, several churches were allocated plots in Green-Wood Cemetery. These included the Presbyterian, Unitarian, and German Lutheran churches of Brooklyn. By the 1850s, various fauna were being introduced to the cemetery.

Expansion and growing popularity

1840s to 1860s 
As early as the 1840s, the cemetery had 30,000 visitors per season during the spring and fall; the visitors took horse-drawn carriages or ferries to the cemetery. To accommodate those who came to the cemetery, a ferry service to the cemetery was established in 1846. The burial ground was expanded multiple times. Originally 175 acres were enclosed, stretching between 21st and 37th Streets from 5th to 9th Avenue. Another  to the east was acquired in 1852 through the annexation of land in the then-separate village of Flatbush. Finally, in 1858 another  was acquired at the southeastern corner of the cemetery grounds. A plot at the southeast corner of the cemetery was purchased in 1863, allowing the commissioners to straighten out that border.

This era was also associated with the construction of other structures. A receiving tomb was installed in 1853, and around the same time, the ponds were cleaned and landscaped. In addition, several gates to the cemetery were added. The main gate at 5th Avenue and 25th Street was built in 1861–65, followed by other entrances near the cemetery's service yard; at 9th Avenue and 20th Street; and at 9th Avenue and 37th Street (later removed). In addition, a gatekeeper's house was installed at the original southern entrance in 1848, the "Thirty Vaults" catacombs in 1854, and a well house in 1855. Furthermore, the paths were paved in the 1860s to allow for easier transport within the cemetery. Several additional ponds were carved out through the 1870s, including Border Water, Dell Water, Crescent Water, Dale Water, and Meadow Water.

At first,  lots were being sold for $100 apiece, and it soon became a frequent place for burials, with 7,000 annual burials and 100,000 graves by the 1860s. Green-Wood became more popular after former governor DeWitt Clinton was disinterred from a cemetery in Albany, the New York state capital, and moved to Green-Wood, where a monument to him was erected in 1853. By the early 1860s it was drawing annual crowds second in size only to Niagara Falls. Numerous guides to the cemetery were published for these visitors, including an illustrated guidebook and a directory in the late 1840s, as well as a cemetery history and a handbook in the late 1860s.

1870s to 1890s 
By the 1860s, Prospect Park was being constructed and public streetcar and elevated lines were established across Brooklyn. In particular, the opening of the Fifth Avenue Elevated station at 25th Street, near the main entrance, proved to be a benefit to lot owners in Green-Wood Cemetery. As a result, in 1876, Green-Wood built the Fort Hamilton gate to accommodate the anticipated extra crowds. By the end of the 19th century, several florists, greenhouses, and monument sellers had opened shops near each of the gates. One such structure was the Weir Greenhouse, located across from the 25th Street entrance; that building is now both a National Register of Historic Places listing and a city landmark.

Improvements also continued throughout the late 19th century. Also, an underground drainage system, extra roads, and a permanent stone fence were built through the late 1870s. The cemetery was enlarged again in 1884 to  via the acquisition of land on the northern border. To prevent the view being marred by the construction of tenements, Green-Wood also purchased lots on the southwest corner. By the 1890s, a reservoir was added atop Mt. Washington, the highest point in the cemetery, while two ponds had been removed. At the turn of the century, an old engine house, stables, and several enclosures were being removed, while waiting rooms and restrooms were added at the southern entrance. During this period, thousands of trees were planted, and roads continued to be graded.

Most famous New Yorkers who died during the second half of the 19th century were buried at Green-Wood. Starting in 1862, free interments were offered to the families of New York soldiers who died in war. In 1868, work started on the installation of the Civil War Soldiers' Monument at the highest point in Green-Wood to commemorate hundreds of thousands of New Yorkers who fought in the war. The monument was not dedicated until 1876. On December 5, 1876, the Brooklyn Theater Fire claimed the lives of at least 278 individuals, with some accounts reporting over 300 dead. Out of that total, 103 unidentified victims were interred in a common grave at Green-Wood Cemetery. An obelisk near the main entrance marks the burial site.

20th century 
Green-Wood has remained non-sectarian, but was generally considered a Christian burial place for white Anglo-Saxon Protestants of good repute. One early regulation was that no one executed for a crime, or even dying in jail, could be buried there. However, the family of infamous political leader "Boss" Tweed managed to circumvent this rule even though he died in the Ludlow Street Jail. The cemetery's chapel was completed in 1913 by Warren and Wetmore, on the site of Arbor Water. By 1916, the cemetery had 325,000 burials.

Modifications to Green-Wood's landscape continued through the 20th century. In 1915, the entrance at 20th Street was realigned to connect with 9th Avenue/Prospect Park West (the entrance there being completed in 1926), and another pond was drained. The landscape was in decline by the late 1910s, but this was followed shortly after by dead-tree removals in the 1920s and a five-year road repaving project began in 1924. Road reconstructions continued through the mid-1930s and demolition of enclosures continued. Notably, the clock tower at the 34th Street entrance was demolished in 1941, and iron fences were removed during World War II for the war effort. The old main entrance was demolished in 1951, and four years later, the first new crematorium in New York City in a half-century was built at Green-Wood, with a columbarium. By the end of the 1950s, another reservoir had been filled for new lots.

More than 1,000 enclosures were removed from 1950 to 1961, the same year that work on a new crematorium began. The columbarium was expanded from 1975 to 1977. However, through the 1970s, vandalism was common at Green-Wood Cemetery. The cemetery was also affected by labor strikes among the gravediggers in 1966, 1973, and 1982. The cemetery also continued to add new structures: the Garden Mausoleum and Community Mausoleum were finished in the late 1980s, and the Hillside Mausoleum was expanded. In addition, in 1994, the north gate was restored and new offices were built. This was followed by the restoration of the chapel in the late 1990s, and it reopened in 2000 after having been closed for four decades.

21st century 

In 1999, The Green-Wood Historic Fund, a 501(c)(3) not-for-profit institution, was created to continue preservation, beautification, educational programs and community outreach as the current "working cemetery" evolves into a Brooklyn cultural institution. The Historic Fund's Civil War Project, an effort to identify and remember Civil War veterans buried at Green-Wood, was created following the rededication ceremony of the Civil War Soldiers' Monument. These early graves had either sunk into the soil, been damaged, or had their markers erased before the monument was restored between 2000 and 2002. Further, construction of the last phase of the Hillside Mausoleum began in 2001, and the same year 50 victims of the September 11 attacks were buried there. By 2009, there was little space for new interments at Green-Wood Cemetery. In December 2010, a memorial was unveiled for the 134 victims of the 1960 New York mid-air collision; the cemetery contains the common grave in which were placed the remains of unidentified victims .

On October 13, 2012, another Angel of Music was installed to replace the one vandalized in 1959, this one made by sculptors Giancarlo Biagi and Jill Burkee, was unveiled to memorialize Louis Moreau Gottschalk. Two weeks later, Hurricane Sandy toppled or damaged at least 292 of the mature trees, 210 gravestones, and 2 mausoleums in the cemetery. The damage was estimated at $500,000. In December 2012 the statue The Triumph of Civic Virtue by Frederick MacMonnies was moved to Green-Wood. In August 2013, in partnership with the Connecticut Society of the Cincinnati, signage in the Battle Hill area of the cemetery was updated to reflect new research on Battle Hill's importance in the Battle of Brooklyn.

Notable burials 

Green-Wood Cemetery's interments include people from a variety of occupations. Painter George Catlin, designer Louis Comfort Tiffany, painter Asher B. Durand, printmakers Nathaniel Currier and James Ives, and architects James Renwick Jr. and Richard Upjohn are among the artists interred in the cemetery. In addition, public leaders William M. Tweed, Henry Ward Beecher, Horace Greeley, and DeWitt Clinton, as well as businessmen Edward R. Squibb, William Colgate, and Charles Pfizer, are buried in the cemetery. Among the burials at the cemetery are six British Commonwealth service personnel whose graves are registered by the Commonwealth War Graves Commission, three from World War I and three from World War II. There are other notable burials like the economist Henry George, Charles Ebbets, Jean-Michel Basquiat, and Leonard Bernstein; rapper Bashar Barakah "Pop Smoke" Jackson; poets Phoebe Cary and Alice Cary; and actor Frank Morgan.

Landmark designations 
The gates of the cemetery were designated a New York City landmark in 1966, and the Weir Greenhouse, used as a visitor's center, was designated as such in 1982. The cemetery was listed on the National Register of Historic Places in 1997 and was granted National Historic Landmark status in 2006 by the U.S. Department of the Interior. The Fort Hamilton Parkway Gate and the cemetery's chapel were designated as official New York City landmarks in 2016.

Gallery

See also 

 List of cemeteries in New York
 List of cemeteries in the United States
 List of mausoleums
 List of New York City Landmarks
 List of National Historic Landmarks in New York City
 National Register of Historic Places listings in Kings County, New York
 Rural Cemetery Act

References 
Notes

Sources
 
 
 
 
 

Further reading

External links 

 
 
 
 Green-Wood Cemetery at Interment.net
 Seasonal and special event pictures of Green-Wood
 Seeking Room for New Graves at Green-Wood, The New York Times
 Video tour of the catacombs and crypts of Green-Wood Cemetery

1838 establishments in New York (state)
Borough Park, Brooklyn
Cemeteries in Brooklyn
Cemeteries on the National Register of Historic Places in New York City
Flatbush, Brooklyn
National Historic Landmarks in New York City
National Register of Historic Places in Brooklyn
New York City Designated Landmarks in Brooklyn
Park Slope
Rural cemeteries
Sunset Park, Brooklyn
Cemeteries established in the 1830s